Iowa Highway 316 (Iowa 316) is a  spur route in central Iowa.  The route begins at Iowa Highway 5 south of Swan and ends at the eastern city limits of Runnells.  Prior to 2003, Iowa 316 extended north to Iowa Highway 163 north of Runnells, but that portion was turned over to Polk County.  The highway's primary purpose is a crossing of the Des Moines River south of Runnells.

Route description

Iowa 316 begins at an intersection with Iowa Highway 5 south of Swan. The first  are in Warren County, while the next  of the road form the Warren/Marion county border.  it crosses over a BNSF Railway line and turns into Warren County. For the rest of its length, the highway closely parallels these railroad tracks. Iowa 316 in Warren County is bordered to the south and east by the Middle River and to the north and east by the Des Moines River, and occasionally, Lake Red Rock. The highway and the railroad tracks approach the main channel on a causeway. The highway crosses the main channel at the Warren / Polk county line, on a simple girder bridge, while the adjacent railroad crosses on an over-deck truss bridge. At the Runnells city limits, Iowa 316 ends abruptly, but the highway continues as McKinney Street.

History
In 1935, Iowa 316 began as a  spur route from U.S. Highway 163 (US 163) south to Runnells. In 1937, US 163 became Iowa Highway 163. It was extended south to Iowa Highway 5 in the early 1980s, appearing on the state map by 1983. The southern portion of Iowa 316 was kept because it is an important crossing of the Des Moines River.

Major intersections

References

External links

316